Sheev Palpatine, also known by his Sith name Darth Sidious, is a fictional character in the Star Wars franchise created by George Lucas. Initially credited as the Emperor in the original trilogy films, he serves as the main antagonist of the nine-film Skywalker saga, in which he is portrayed by Ian McDiarmid.

In the original trilogy, Palpatine is depicted as the Emperor of the Galactic Empire and the master of Darth Vader. In the prequel trilogy, he is portrayed as a charismatic politician—and, secretly, a Sith Lord—who orchestrates the Clone Wars, all but exterminates the Jedi Order, ends the Galactic Republic, and seduces Jedi Knight Anakin Skywalker to the dark side of the Force. In The Rise of Skywalker (2019), the final film in the sequel trilogy, Palpatine is revealed to be the mastermind behind the First Order and the creator of its former leader, Snoke, as well as the grandfather of Rey. 

Since the release of Return of the Jedi, Palpatine has become a widely recognized symbol of evil in popular culture, and since the prequel films, also one of sinister deception and the subversion of democracy. Aside from the films, Palpatine appears in various canon and non-canon Star Wars media. The character recurs throughout the TV series Clone Wars (2003–05), The Clone Wars (2008–14, 2020), Rebels (2014–18), and The Bad Batch (2021–), Obi Wan Kenobi (2022) and Tales of the Jedi (2022), all set before the events of the original trilogy.

Character overview
In the Star Wars fictional universe, Palpatine is initially a senator from Naboo, presenting himself to the public as a champion of democracy. However, he is really Darth Sidious, a Dark Lord of the Sith who plans to destroy the Jedi and take permanent control of the galaxy. As Sidious, Palpatine engineers the invasion of Naboo, using the conflict to get elected as Supreme Chancellor of the Galactic Republic. He further masterminds the Clone Wars to grant himself dictatorial emergency powers and stay in office long after his term expires.

Palpatine proceeds to almost entirely exterminate the Jedi through Order 66 and manipulate Jedi Knight Anakin Skywalker into becoming his new apprentice, Darth Vader. He transforms the Galactic Republic into the Empire and declares himself Emperor, using Machiavellian manipulation to invoke martial law. Palpatine rules the galaxy for over two decades before Vader betrays and kills him to save his son, Luke Skywalker.

Thirty years later, Palpatine resurrects himself. He secretly masterminds the First Order to restore the Empire, with Supreme Leader Snoke as his puppet ruler. Having covertly turned Kylo Ren — Anakin's grandson and Luke's nephew — to the dark side of the Force, Palpatine orders Ren to find and kill Rey, the last remaining Jedi and Palpatine's paternal granddaughter. Palpatine is ultimately defeated and destroyed by Rey.

Appearances

Canon

Films

Palpatine is the main antagonist in the Skywalker saga (1977–2019), appearing in all three film trilogies.

Original trilogy
The character is referred to as "the Emperor" in the original trilogy. He is briefly mentioned in Star Wars (1977), the first film in the original trilogy, which was later subtitled Episode IVA New Hope. On the Death Star, Grand Moff Tarkin (Peter Cushing) explains to his fellow Imperials that the Emperor has dissolved the Imperial Senate, the last remnant of the Old Republic. The Emperor does not appear on-screen, leaving Tarkin and Darth Vader (portrayed by David Prowse, voiced by James Earl Jones) as the film's main villains.

The Emperor first appears in The Empire Strikes Back, the 1980 sequel to the original film. He appears as a hologram to inform Vader that Luke Skywalker (Mark Hamill) has become a threat to the Empire. Vader persuades him that the young Jedi would be a great asset if he could be turned to the dark side of the Force.

In 1983's Return of the Jedi, the Emperor appears in person to oversee the last stages of the second Death Star's construction. He assures Vader that they will together turn Luke, Vader's son, to the dark side of the Force. Unbeknownst to Vader, the Emperor plans to replace him with Luke; Vader, meanwhile, intends to overthrow the Emperor and rule the galaxy with Luke at his side. When Vader brings Luke before his master, the Emperor tempts Luke to join the dark side by appealing to the young Jedi's fear for his friends, whom he has lured into a trap. This leads to a lightsaber duel in which Luke defeats and nearly kills Vader. The Emperor urges Luke to kill Vader and take his place, but Luke refuses and declares himself a Jedi. Enraged, the Emperor attacks Luke with Force lightning. Unable to bear the sight of his son in pain, Vader throws the Emperor down a chasm shortly before the Death Star is destroyed.

Prequel trilogy

In the 1999 prequel Episode I: The Phantom Menace, set 32 years before A New Hope, Palpatine (named onscreen for the first time) is depicted as a middle-aged Galactic Senator from the planet Naboo. As his alter ego, the Sith Lord Darth Sidious, he advises the corrupt Trade Federation to blockade and invade Naboo. Queen Padmé Amidala of Naboo (Natalie Portman) flees to the planet Coruscant to receive counsel from Palpatine, unaware that he actually engineered the invasion. After a plea for help from the Senate results in bureaucratic delays, Palpatine persuades Padmé to call for a motion of no confidence against Supreme Chancellor Finis Valorum (Terence Stamp).

When Padmé attempts to liberate Naboo, Sidious sends his apprentice Darth Maul (portrayed by Ray Park, voiced by Peter Serafinowicz) to capture her. The invasion is eventually thwarted and Maul is defeated in a lightsaber duel with Jedi Padawan Obi-Wan Kenobi (Ewan McGregor). Palpatine uses the crisis to get elected as the new Chancellor of the Republic. He then returns to Naboo, where he befriends the nine-year-old Anakin Skywalker (Jake Lloyd), telling the boy, "We will watch your career with great interest."

In the 2002 sequel Episode II: Attack of the Clones, set 10 years later, Palpatine exploits constitutional loopholes to remain in office after his term expires. Meanwhile, as Sidious, he continues to manipulate events from behind the scenes by having his new Sith apprentice Count Dooku (Christopher Lee) lead a movement of planets in seceding to form the Confederacy of Independent Systems. He has the Separatists try to assassinate Padmé, now a senator, but the attempt on her life fails. He then arranges for Anakin (now played by Hayden Christensen) to guard Padmé on Naboo, which leads to them falling in love and marrying in secret.

With the Separatists secretly building a battle droid army, Palpatine uses the situation to have himself granted emergency powers. Palpatine feigns reluctance to accept this authority, promising to return it to the Senate once the crisis has ended. His first act is to allow a clone army's creation to counter the Separatist threat; this results in the first battle of the Clone Wars. With the galaxy now at war as Sidious planned, Dooku brings him the secret plans for the Death Star.

In the 2005 sequel Episode III: Revenge of the Sith, set three years later, Palpatine is captured by cyborg Separatist leader General Grievous (voiced by Matthew Wood). Palpatine is rescued by Anakin and Obi-Wan, but not before the Jedi confront Dooku again. A duel ensues in which Anakin kills Dooku at Palpatine's urging. Palpatine then escapes with his rescuers and returns to Coruscant. By this point, Palpatine has become a virtual dictator, able to take any action in the Senate. He makes Anakin his personal representative on the Jedi Council, whose members deny Anakin the rank of Jedi Master and order him to spy on the Chancellor. Palpatine tells Anakin the story of Darth Plagueis, a powerful Sith Lord who was able to create life and prevent death, but was killed by his own apprentice. Eventually, Palpatine reveals his secret Sith identity to Anakin; he knows that Anakin has been having prophetic visions of Padmé dying in childbirth, and offers to teach him Plagueis' secrets to save Padmé's life.

Anakin informs Jedi Master Mace Windu (Samuel L. Jackson) of Palpatine's treachery. With three other Jedi masters at his side, Windu attempts to arrest Palpatine, but Palpatine produces a lightsaber and quickly dispatches all but Windu. Palpatine engages Windu in a duel and attacks him with Force lightning; Windu deflects the lightning back into Palpatine's face, deforming it into the gray, wizened visage first seen in the original trilogy. Before Windu can kill Palpatine, Anakin appears and intervenes on the Sith Lord's behalf, allowing Palpatine to kill Windu with another blast of lightning. Anakin then pledges himself to the dark side as Palpatine's Sith apprentice, Darth Vader.

Palpatine issues Order 66, commanding the clone troopers to turn on their Jedi generals, while dispatching Vader to kill everyone inside the Jedi Temple and then murder the Separatist leaders on the planet Mustafar. Palpatine then reorganizes the Republic into the Galactic Empire, with himself as Emperor. Jedi Master Yoda (voiced by Frank Oz) confronts Palpatine and engages him in a lightsaber duel that ends in a stalemate. Sensing that Vader is in danger, Palpatine travels to Mustafar and finds his new apprentice near death following a duel with Obi-Wan. After returning to Coruscant, he rebuilds Vader's burned, mutilated body with the black armored suit from the original trilogy. Palpatine then tells Vader that Padmé was killed in the heat of Vader's anger, breaking what remains of Vader's spirit. Palpatine is last seen watching the original Death Star's construction, with Vader and Wilhuff Tarkin (Wayne Pygram) at his side.

Sequel trilogy
In the sequel trilogy, set three decades following the events of Return of the Jedi, the First Order has risen from the fallen Empire and seeks to destroy the New Republic, the Resistance, and Jedi Master Luke Skywalker. In the trilogy's first installment, The Force Awakens (2015), Palpatine's voice is heard during a vision that the protagonist Rey (Daisy Ridley) experiences upon touching Luke and Anakin's lightsaber. In the sequel, The Last Jedi (2017), Luke briefly mentions Palpatine as Darth Sidious while explaining the fall of the Jedi Order to Rey.

Palpatine, again played by McDiarmid, appears in the trilogy's final film, The Rise of Skywalker (2019). Prior to the film's opening, Palpatine threatens revenge against the galaxy, having used the dark side to cheat death. This prompts First Order leader and fallen Jedi Kylo Ren (Adam Driver)—the grandson of Anakin and nephew of Luke—to seek him out on the Sith planet Exegol, where a physically impaired Palpatine is supported by machinery. Palpatine reveals himself as the mastermind behind the First Order and Ren's former master, Supreme Leader Snoke (Andy Serkis), whom he created to lure Ren to the dark side. He then unveils the Final Order, a massive fleet of Star Destroyers built by the Sith Eternal. Palpatine offers the fleet to Ren on the condition that he find and kill the galaxy's last remaining Jedi, Rey, who is revealed to be Palpatine's granddaughter. It is subsequently revealed that Palpatine had a son who renounced him; the son and his partner took their daughter Rey to the planet Jakku, assuming lives as "nobodies" to keep her safe. Palpatine's assassin Ochi eventually found Rey's parents and killed them on his orders, but never found Rey.

Near the end of the film, Rey arrives on Exegol to confront Palpatine. Surrounded by his Sith loyalists, Palpatine embodies all the Sith's power. He orders Rey to kill him in anger so his spirit can pass into her, which will allow him to possess her body. Rey refuses, and she and Ren (now the redeemed Ben Solo) confront Palpatine together. Sensing their power as a dyad in the Force, Palpatine absorbs their life energy to rejuvenate his body. He incapacitates Ben and attacks the Resistance fleet with Force lightning. Rey uses the power of the past Jedi to face Palpatine once more; he attacks her with lightning, but Rey deflects it using the Skywalker lightsabers, destroying Palpatine, and the Sith, once and for all.

Television

The Clone Wars 
In the 2008 animated film Star Wars: The Clone Wars and the subsequent animated series (set between Attack of the Clones and Revenge of the Sith), Palpatine continues to serve as Supreme Chancellor while his Sith identity orchestrates the Clone Wars behind the scenes. Palpatine was voiced by Ian Abercrombie (from 2008 to his death in 2012), and by Tim Curry (from 2012 to 2014). In the film, Sidious engineers a Separatist plot in which Count Dooku (voiced by Corey Burton) turns Jabba the Hutt (voiced by Kevin Michael Richardson) against the Republic by kidnapping his son Rotta and framing the Jedi for it. Meanwhile, Palpatine suggests that the Republic ally itself with the Hutts. Although Anakin Skywalker and his Padawan Ahsoka Tano (voiced by Ashley Eckstein) foil the plot, the outcome suits Palpatine's ends: Jabba places Hutt hyperspace routes at the Republic's disposal.

In season two of the TV series, Sidious hires bounty hunter Cad Bane (voiced by Corey Burton) to infiltrate the Jedi Temple and steal a holocron. He then takes a valuable Kyber memory crystal that contains the names of thousands of Force-sensitive younglings – the future of the Jedi Order – from around the galaxy. The final stage of the plot: to bring four Force-sensitive children to Sidious' secret facility on Mustafar. Anakin and Ahsoka again foil the plot, but Bane escapes and all evidence of Sidious' involvement is lost. In season three, Sidious senses Dooku's assassin Asajj Ventress (voiced by Nika Futterman) becoming powerful in the dark side and orders Dooku to eliminate her; he suspects that Dooku is planning to have Ventress assassinate him. Ventress survives and her revenge against Dooku sets off a chain of events including the return of Sidious' former apprentice and Dooku's predecessor, Darth Maul.

In season five, Sidious personally travels to the planet Mandalore to confront Maul, who has become the leader of Death Watch. Sidious kills Maul's brother Savage Opress (voiced by Clancy Brown) before torturing Maul with the intent to make use of his former apprentice. In season six, Sidious goes to lengths to conceal his plan from the Jedi by silencing Clone Trooper Fives from learning of Order 66, and having Dooku wipe out anything tied to the former Jedi Master's connection to the conspiracy.

Rebels 

In Star Wars Rebels, set between Revenge of the Sith and A New Hope, Palpatine is portrayed as the Emperor of the Galactic Empire. He briefly appears off-screen at the end of season two's premiere "The Siege of Lothal" (originally voiced by Sam Witwer and later Ian McDiarmid from 2019). Darth Vader informs Palpatine that the Rebel Alliance cell on Lothal has been broken and that Ahsoka Tano is alive and is now helping the Rebels. Palpatine sees this as an opportunity to seek out other remaining Jedi, ordering Vader to dispatch an Inquisitor to hunt down Ahsoka.

Palpatine returns physically in season four (voiced again by McDiarmid). In the episodes "Wolves and a Door" and "A World Between Worlds", he appears as a hologram overseeing the excavation of the Lothal Jedi Temple, which contains a portal to a separate dimension of the Force outside of space and time, which Palpatine considers a 'conduit between the living and the dead' that could give him unrivaled power of the Force itself if he can access it. Shortly after protagonist Ezra Bridger (voiced by Taylor Gray) reaches through time and space to rescue Ahsoka from Vader, Palpatine sets up a portal that shows Jedi Master Kanan Jarrus' (voiced by Freddie Prinze Jr.) final moments. While Ezra wants to reach through the portal and rescue Kanan, Ahsoka convinces him not to. Palpatine then reveals himself through the portal and attacks Ezra with Force lightning. However, Ahsoka and Ezra manage to evade him and go their separate ways, thus denying Palpatine full power.

Palpatine later returns in the series finale "Family Reunion - and Farewell". In the episode, Ezra, having surrendered himself to Grand Admiral Thrawn (voiced by Lars Mikkelsen) to protect Lothal, is taken by him to a room containing a reconstructed section of the ruined Jedi Temple and a hologram of Palpatine as he appears in the prequel films. Palpatine, having acknowledged the threat Ezra poses to the Empire, presents himself as a kindly old man and shows Ezra a vision of his dead parents through a doorway, promising that the youth will be with them if he enters it. Ezra is initially mesmerized by Palpatine's promise and goes to enter the door, but finally resists and destroys the reconstructed Jedi Temple and the illusion. Palpatine's hologram emerges from the rubble, flickering to show his true self, and commands his Royal Guards to kill Ezra, though Ezra manages to defeat them and escape. According to series creator Dave Filoni, the events of Rogue One and A New Hope happen shortly after this episode, thus refocusing Palpatine's attention from Ezra and Lothal's liberation to the Rebel Alliance and Luke Skywalker.

The Bad Batch 
Palpatine appears in the first season of the 2021 animated series Star Wars: The Bad Batch. The series is set during (and immediately following) the events of the 2005 film Revenge of the Sith. The series' first episode depicts Palpatine's senate speech from the film in animated form, using the archive sound of McDiarmid's dialogue. As in the film, Palpatine orders the extermination of the Jedi and declares himself emperor.

Obi-Wan Kenobi 
Palpatine appears in the sixth episode of the 2022 series Obi-Wan Kenobi. The series is set ten years after Revenge of the Sith. After Darth Vader is defeated by Obi-Wan Kenobi following their second duel, Palpatine contacts Vader in his Mustafar castle via hologram, questioning Vader's motives and loyalty when Vader reports that he will not rest until Obi-Wan is found. Vader reassures Palpatine that Obi-Wan does not mean anything, reaffirms his commitment to Palpatine and abandons his search.

Tales of the Jedi 
Darth Sidous appears in the fourth episode of the Tales of the Jedi TV series talking with Darth Tyrranus.

Books and comics 
The first appearance of Palpatine in Star Wars literature was in the prologue of Alan Dean Foster's ghostwritten novelization of the script of A New Hope, published as Star Wars: From the Adventures of Luke Skywalker (1976). His background as a senator of the Republic was explored in James Kahn's novelization of Return of the Jedi.

Palpatine also appears in Rae Carson's novelization of The Rise of Skywalker, which expands upon the film's story. In the book, Palpatine is revealed to have discovered the "secret to immortality" from his former master, Darth Plagueis, using this knowledge to survive after his death in Return of the Jedi. The novelization also describes Palpatine's son as a failed clone of himself. However, the 2021 book Skywalker: A Family at War describes Palpatine's son as an "offshoot of [his] genetic research, not precisely a clone but made of cloned tissue and donated cells."

Star Wars: Lords of the Sith (2015) was one of the first canon spin-off novels to be released in the Disney canon begun in 2014. In it, Vader and Palpatine find themselves hunted by revolutionaries on the Twi'lek home planet Ryloth. In Thrawn (2017), the titular character warns Palpatine of "threats lurking in the Unknown Regions." Chuck Wendig's Aftermath book trilogy reveals that, prior to his death, Palpatine enacted a plan for the remnants of the Empire, intended to be led by his adoptive son Gallius Rax, to retreat to the Unknown Regions, where they formed into the First Order. The dark side was thought to be concentrated in this region, where one Sith cultist believed that Palpatine would be found alive. The upcoming illustrated book Star Wars: The Secrets of the Sith is told from Palpatine's perspective.

Palpatine appears frequently in the comic book series Darth Vader: Dark Lord of the Sith (2017–2018), written by Kieron Gillen and Charles Soule. It is suggested at the end of the series that Palpatine manipulated the Force to impregnate Vader's mother Shmi Skywalker, making him, in essence, Vader's father—although this is left somewhat ambiguous. This builds on the plot point of Anakin's virgin birth introduced in The Phantom Menace, and the claim that a Sith lord "could use the Force to influence the midi-chlorians to create life," as Palpatine tells Anakin in Revenge of the Sith. This would seem to have incestuous implications for Rey and Ben Solo at the end of The Rise of Skywalker, but Soule says that "The Dark Side is not a reliable narrator," and a Lucasfilm story group member who collaborated on the comic confirmed that a direct connection between Palpatine and Vader was not their intent.

The character also appears in the final chapter of the comic book Star Wars: The Rise of Kylo Ren (2020), which illustrates Palpatine's manipulation of the young Ben Solo into becoming Kylo Ren.

Video games 
Star Wars Battlefront II adds a canonical tale spanning the destruction of the second Death Star through the events of The Force Awakens. The story takes an Imperial perspective, following an elite squadron known as Inferno Squad, led by protagonist Iden Versio, as they help execute Operation: Cinder following the Emperor's death. Operation: Cinder was carried out by the Galactic Empire as a means of devastating several Imperial planets a few weeks after the Battle of Endor. The operation was part of the "Contingency", a plan devised by Emperor Palpatine to ensure that the Empire and its enemies would not outlive him should he perish. The plan was put into action following the Emperor's death during the Battle of Endor.

Palpatine's threat of revenge referenced in the opening crawl of The Rise of Skywalker was included in the finale of the Fortnite: Battle Royale X Star Wars event. The character has appeared in every Lego Star Wars video game to date, including Lego Star Wars: The Skywalker Saga.

Legends
In April 2014, Lucasfilm rebranded most of the licensed Star Wars novels and comics produced since the originating 1977 film Star Wars as Star Wars Legends and declared them non-canon to the franchise. Star Wars Legends literature elaborates on Palpatine's role in Star Wars fiction outside of the films.

Television

Palpatine/Darth Sidious is a central character in Genndy Tartakovsky's Star Wars: Clone Wars micro-series, which is set between Attack of the Clones and Revenge of the Sith. The character's likeness in the series is voiced by Nick Jameson. In the first chapter, Palpatine is informed by Obi-Wan Kenobi (voiced by James Arnold Taylor) that the Jedi have discovered that the InterGalactic Banking Clan has established battle droid factories on the planet Muunilinst. Palpatine agrees to send a strike force that includes Anakin Skywalker (voiced by Mat Lucas) and suggests that Anakin be given "special command" of Obi-Wan's fighters. Yoda and Obi-Wan initially speak against the idea but reluctantly concede. In the seventh chapter, a holographic image of Sidious appears shortly after Dooku trains Dark Jedi Asajj Ventress (voiced by Grey DeLisle). Sidious orders Ventress to track down and kill Anakin. He remarks to Dooku that Ventress is certain to be defeated, but that the point of her mission is to test Anakin. In the final chapters, a hologram of Sidious again appears and orders General Grievous to begin an assault on the galactic capital. Later, the Separatist invasion of Coruscant begins and Palpatine watches from his apartment in the 500 Republica. Grievous breaks through the Chancellor's window and attempts to kidnap him, leading to a long chase while Palpatine is protected by Jedi Shaak Ti (voiced by Tasia Valenza), Roron Corobb and Foul Moudama. After Grievous defeats the Jedi, Palpatine is taken on board the Invisible Hand, setting the stage for Revenge of the Sith.

Books and comics

Palpatine made his first major appearance in Star Wars-related comic books in 1991 and 1992, with the Dark Empire series written by Tom Veitch and illustrated by Cam Kennedy. In the series (set six years after Return of the Jedi), Palpatine is resurrected as the Emperor Reborn, or "Palpatine the Undying". His spirit returns from the netherworld of the Force with the aid of Sith ghosts on Korriban and possesses the body of Jeng Droga, one of Palpatine's elite spies and assassins known as the Emperor's Hands. Droga flees to a secret Imperial base on the planet Byss, where the Emperor's advisor Sate Pestage exorcises Palpatine's spirit and channels it into one of many clones created by Palpatine before his death. Palpatine attempts to resume control of the galaxy, but Luke Skywalker, now a senior Jedi Knight, sabotages his plans. Luke destroys most of Palpatine's cloning tanks but is only able to defeat the Emperor with help from Leia Organa Solo, who has received rudimentary Jedi training from Luke. The two repel a Force storm Palpatine had created and turn it back onto him, once again destroying his physical form.

Palpatine's ultimate fate is further chronicled in the Dark Empire II and Empire's End series of comics. The Dark Empire II series, published from 1994 to 1995, details how the Emperor is once again reborn on Byss into a clone body. Palpatine tries to rebuild the Empire as the Rebel Alliance grows weak. In Empire's End (1995), a traitorous Imperial guard bribes Palpatine's cloning supervisor to tamper with the Emperor's stored DNA samples. This causes the clones to deteriorate at a rapid rate. Palpatine tries to possess the body of Anakin Solo, the infant son of Leia Organa and Han Solo, before the clone body dies, but is thwarted once again by Luke Skywalker. Palpatine is killed by a blaster shot fired by Han, but his spirit is captured by the mortally wounded Jedi Empatojayos Brand. When Brand dies, he takes Palpatine's spirit with him into the netherworld of the Force, destroying the Sith Lord once and for all.

Novels and comics published before 1999 focus on Palpatine's role as Galactic Emperor. Shadows of the Empire (1996) by Steve Perry and The Mandalorian Armor (1998) by K. W. Jeter—both set between The Empire Strikes Back and Return of the Jedi—show how Palpatine uses crime lords such as Prince Xizor and bounty hunters like Boba Fett to fight his enemies. In the Jedi Prince series of young-reader novels (1992–1993) by Paul and Hollace Davids, set about a year after Return of the Jedi, a three-eyed mutant named Triclops is revealed to be Palpatine's illegitimate son; he had a son named Ken, the titular "Jedi Prince". Barbara Hambly's novel Children of the Jedi (1995), set eight years after Return of the Jedi, features a woman named Roganda Ismaren who claims that Palpatine fathered her son Irek.

After the release of The Phantom Menace, writers were allowed to begin exploring Palpatine's backstory as a politician and Sith lord. The comic "Marked" by Rob Williams, printed in Star Wars Tales 24 (2005), and Michael Reaves' novel Darth Maul: Shadow Hunter (2001) explain Darth Sidious' relationship with his apprentice Darth Maul. Cloak of Deception (2001) by James Luceno follows Reaves' novel and details how Darth Sidious encourages the Trade Federation to build an army of battle droids in preparation for the invasion of Naboo. Cloak of Deception also focuses on Palpatine's early political career, revealing how he becomes a confidant of Chancellor Finis Valorum and acquainted with Padmé Amidala, newly elected queen of Naboo. Palpatine's role during the Clone Wars as Chancellor of the Republic and Darth Sidious is portrayed in novels such as Matthew Stover's Shatterpoint (2003), Steven Barnes' The Cestus Deception (2004), Sean Stewart's Yoda: Dark Rendezvous (2004), and Luceno's Labyrinth of Evil (2005) and Darth Plagueis (2012).

Following the theatrical release of Revenge of the Sith, Star Wars literature focused on Palpatine's role after the creation of the Empire. John Ostrander's comic Star Wars Republic 78: Loyalties (2005) chronicles how, shortly after seizing power, Emperor Palpatine sends Darth Vader to assassinate Sagoro Autem, an Imperial captain who plans to defect from the Empire. In Luceno's novel Dark Lord: The Rise of Darth Vader (2005) (set shortly after Revenge of the Sith), the Emperor sends Darth Vader to the planet Murkhana to discover why clone troopers there refused to carry out Order 66 against their Jedi generals. Palpatine hopes these early missions will teach Vader what it means to be a Sith and crush any remnants of Anakin Skywalker.

James Luceno's 2012 novel Darth Plagueis depicts Palpatine's early life, prior to the films. The scion of an aristocratic family on Naboo, Palpatine first turns toward the dark side upon meeting the titular Sith lord. Sensing great power in Palpatine, Plageuis takes him on as his Sith apprentice. In the final test of his devotion to the dark side, Palpatine kills his parents and his brother and sister.

Video games 
In The Force Unleashed the empire has captured the rebel leaders and helds them on the Death Star. Vader's former apprentice Galen Marec/Starkiller battles his way through the station, defeats Vader and faces the Emperor, who tries to goad him into killing Vader so Starkiller can take his place. Starkiller defeats the Emperor, but spares him. The Emperor then unleashes Force lightning at Starkillers companion Rahm Kota, but Starkiller absorbs it, sacrificing himself to allow the rebels to escape. 

In the noncanocial dark side ending Starkiller kills Vader and is congratulated by the Emperor, who commands him to kill Kota. Starkiller instead attacks the Emperor, who foils his attempt and then crushes him and the rebels with a ship. Starkiller later awakens to find his body being grafted with armor to continue serving the Emperor.

In the again noncanocial DLC to The Force Unleashed II the Rebel Alliance gets defeated in the battle of Endor. The Emperor then subdues Vader with Force lightning while chastising him for resurrecting his failed apprentice as a clone.

Characterization

In Star Wars fiction, Palpatine is a cunning politician, a ruthless emperor, and an evil Sith Lord. The Star Wars Databank describes him as "the supreme ruler of the most powerful tyrannical regime the galaxy had ever witnessed".

As a senator, Palpatine is "unassuming, yet ambitious". In Cloak of Deception, James Luceno writes that Palpatine carefully guards his privacy and "others found his reclusiveness intriguing, as if he led a secret life". Despite this, he has many allies in the government. Luceno writes, "What Palpatine lacked in charisma, he made up for in candor, and it was that directness that had led to his widespread appeal in the senate. ... For in his heart he judged the universe on his own terms, with a clear sense of right and wrong." In Terry Brooks' novelization of The Phantom Menace, Palpatine claims to embrace democratic principles. He tells Queen Amidala, "I promise, Your Majesty, if I am elected [chancellor of the Republic], I will restore democracy to the Republic. I will put an end to the corruption that has plagued the Senate." A Visual Dictionary states that he is a self-proclaimed savior.

As Emperor, however, Palpatine abandons any semblance of democracy, as noted in A New Hope, when he abolishes the Imperial Senate. Sansweet states, "His Empire ... is based on tyranny."

Revenge of the Sith implies that Palpatine was the apprentice of Darth Plagueis, while later Expanded Universe materials say explicitly that he was. Palpatine is characterized as "the most powerful practitioner of the Sith ways in modern times." Palpatine is so powerful that he is able to mask his true identity from the Jedi for decades. In the novel Shatterpoint, Mace Windu remarks to Yoda, "A shame [Palpatine] can't touch the Force. He might have been a fine Jedi."

The Star Wars Databank explains that the Force "granted him inhuman dexterity and speed, agility enough to quickly kill three Jedi Masters" (as depicted in Revenge of the Sith). Stover describes the duel between Yoda and Palpatine in his novelization of Revenge of the Sith thus: "From the shadow of a black wing, a small weapon ... slid into a withered hand and spat a flame-colored blade ... When those blades met, it was more than Yoda against Palpatine, more the millennia of Sith against the legions of Jedi; this was the expression of the fundamental conflict of the universe itself. Light against dark. Winner takes all." During the duel, Yoda realizes that Sidious is a superior warrior, and represents a small but powerful Sith Order that had changed and evolved over the years, while the Jedi had not: "He had lost before he started. He had lost before he was born."

According to the Databank and New Essential Guide to Characters, Palpatine possesses great patience and his maneuverings are as a dejarik grandmaster moves pieces on a board. He is depicted as a diabolical genius.

Palpatine was not given a first name in any canonical or "Star Wars Legends" sources until 2014, when the character's first name—Sheev—was revealed in the novel Tarkin, written by James Luceno. The Lucasfilm Story Group approached Del Rey Books and asked if they wanted to use the name, which was created by George Lucas, in the Tarkin novel, to which Del Rey agreed.

Creation
Lucas' conceptualization of Palpatine and the role the character plays in Star Wars changed over time. From Return of the Jedi onwards, Palpatine became the ultimate personification of evil in Star Wars, replacing Darth Vader as the central villain.

When the original Star Wars trilogy was filmed, the Emperor was unnamed and his throne-world unidentified. The name would not be used in the film until the prequel trilogy, and the first mention of the name Palpatine came from the prologue of Alan Dean Foster's 1976 novelization of A New Hope, which detailed the Emperor's rise to power. Foster writes,

It is unclear whether Lucas intended Palpatine to be the reigning Emperor or just the first of a succession of emperors. In The Secret History of Star Wars, Michael Kaminski states that Lucas' initial notes discuss a line of corrupt emperors, not just one. If Palpatine was the first, Kaminski infers, he would therefore not be the current emperor. However, by the time of Return of the Jedi and its novelization, Palpatine was made the name of the current emperor.

During story conferences for The Empire Strikes Back, Lucas and Leigh Brackett decided that "the Emperor and the Force had to be the two main concerns in [the film]; the Emperor had barely been dealt with in the first movie, and the intention in the sequel was to deal with him on a more concrete level." Lucas ultimately decided instead to focus on the Emperor in Return of the Jedi.

In that film, the initial conception of Palpatine was superseded by his depiction as a dictatorial ruler adept in the dark side of the Force. The Emperor was inspired by the villain Ming the Merciless from the Flash Gordon comic books. The characterization of Palpatine as an ambitious and ruthless politician dismantling a democratic republic to achieve supreme power is in part inspired by the real-world examples of democratic backsliding during the rise and rule of Julius Caesar, Napoleon Bonaparte, and Adolf Hitler. Other elements of the character come from Richard Nixon. Lucas said that Nixon's presidency "got me to thinking historically about how do democracies get turned into dictatorships. Because the democracies aren't overthrown; they're given away." Lucas also said, "The whole point of the movies, the underlying element that makes the movies work, is that you, whether you go backwards or forwards, you start out in a democracy, and democracy turns into a dictatorship, and then the rebels make it back into a democracy."

Lucas wanted to establish the Emperor as the true source of evil in Star Wars. Screenwriter Lawrence Kasdan noted, "My sense of the relationship between Darth Vader and the Emperor is that the Emperor is much more powerful ... and that Vader is very much intimidated by him. Vader has dignity, but the Emperor in Jedi really has all the power." He explained that the climax of the film is a confrontation between Darth Vader and his master. In the first scene that shows the Emperor, he arrives at the Death Star and is greeted by a host of stormtroopers, technicians, and other personnel. Lucas states he wanted it to look like the military parades on "May Day in Russia."

Lucas fleshed out the Emperor in the prequel films. According to Lucas, Palpatine's role in The Phantom Menace is to explain "how Anakin Skywalker came to be Palpatine's apprentice" and the events that led to his rise to power. The films novelization is the first time he is called Sidious. It also marks the first time the title Darth is used for someone other than Vader.

In Star Wars and History published by Lucasfilm, it describes Palpatine's consolidation of power as being similar to the Roman political figure Augustus. Both legitimized authoritarian rule by saying that corruption in the Senate was hampering the powers of the head of state; both pressured the Senate to grant extraordinary powers to deal with a crisis, falsely claiming that they would rescind those powers once the crisis was over; and both relied on their strong control over military force.

Portrayal
When the Emperor first appeared in The Empire Strikes Back, he was portrayed by Marjorie Eaton under heavy makeup. Chimpanzee eyes were superimposed into darkened eye sockets during post-production. The character was voiced by Clive Revill. The makeup was sculpted by Phil Tippett and applied by Rick Baker, who initially used his own wife, Elaine, for the makeup tests.

"With [director Irvin] Kershner," Revill said, "you had to keep the reins tight — you couldn't go overboard. It was the perfect example of the old adage 'less is more' — the Emperor doesn't say very much. But when he finally appears, it's at a point in the saga when everyone's waiting to see him. It's the Emperor, the arch-villain of all time, and when he says there's a great disturbance in the Force, I mean, that's enough oomph!" Years later, during production of Revenge of the Sith, Lucas decided to shoot new footage for The Empire Strikes Back to create continuity between the prequels and original trilogy. Thus, in the 2004 DVD release of The Empire Strikes Back Special Edition, the original version of the Emperor was replaced by Scottish Shakespearean actor Ian McDiarmid, and the dialogue between the Emperor and Darth Vader was revised.

Lucas and director Richard Marquand cast McDiarmid to play Emperor Palpatine for Return of the Jedi. He was in his late 30s and had never played a leading role in a feature film, though he had made minor appearances in films like Dragonslayer (1981). After Return of the Jedi, he resumed stage acting in London. In an interview with BackStage, McDiarmid revealed that he "never had his sights set on a film career and never even auditioned for the role of Palpatine." He elaborated, "I got called in for the interview after a Return of the Jedi casting director saw me perform in the Sam Shepard play Seduced at a studio theatre at the Royal Court. I was playing a dying Howard Hughes."

McDiarmid was surprised when Lucas approached him 16 years after Return of the Jedi to reprise the role of Palpatine. In an interview, he stated, "When we were doing Return of the Jedi there was a rumor that George Lucas had nine films in his head, and he'd clearly just completed three of them." McDiarmid added, "Someone said that, 'Oh, I think what he might do next is go back in time, and show how Vader came to be.' It never occurred to me in a million years that I would be involved in that, because I thought, 'oh well, then he'll get a much younger actor to play Palpatine. That would be obvious." However, "I was the right age, ironically, for the first prequel when it was made. ... So I was in the very strange and rather wonderful paradox of playing myself when young at my own age, having played myself previously when 100-and-I-don't-know-what."

Palpatine's role in the prequel films required McDiarmid to play two dimensions of the same character. Recalling the initial days of shooting The Phantom Menace, McDiarmid stated, "Stepping onto the set of Episode I for the first time was like going back in time, due to my experience in Jedi. Palpatine's an interesting character; he's conventional on the outside, but demonic on the inside — he's on the edge, trying to go beyond what's possible." McDiarmid added another layer to the character in Attack of the Clones. He noted, "[Palpatine] is a supreme actor. He has to be even more convincing than somebody who isn't behaving in a schizophrenic fashion, so he's extra charming, or extra professional — and for those who are looking for clues, that's almost where you can see them." McDiarmid illuminated on the scene where Padmé Amidala is almost assassinated:

In Revenge of the Sith, McDiarmid played a darker interpretation of the character. He explained that "when you're playing a character of solid blackness, that in itself is very interesting, in the sense that you have no other motivation other than the accumulation of power. It's not so much about not having a moral center, it's just that the only thing that mattered is increasing power." He admitted, "I've been trying to find a redeeming feature to Palpatine, and the only one I've got so far is that he's clearly a patron of the arts because he goes to the opera." McDiarmid compared the character to Iago from William Shakespeare's Othello:

McDiarmid noticed that the script for Revenge of the Sith demanded more action from his character than in previous films. Lightsaber combat was a challenge to the 60-year-old actor, who, like his costars, took fencing lessons. The close-up shots and non-acrobatic sequences of the duel between Palpatine and Mace Windu were performed by McDiarmid. Advanced fencing and acrobatic stunts were executed by McDiarmid's doubles, Michael Byrne, Sebastian Dickins, and Bob Bowles.

McDiarmid's performance as Palpatine was generally well received by critics. Todd McCarthy of Variety commented, "Entertaining from start to finish and even enthralling at times, 'Sith' has some acting worth writing home about, specifically McDiarmid's dominant turn as the mastermind of the evil empire."  Ed Halter of The Village Voice wrote that "Ian McDiarmid's unctuous Emperor turns appropriately vampiric as he attempts to draw Anakin into the Sith fold with promises of eternal life." Still, his performance was not without detractors; David Edelstein of Slate critiqued, "McDiarmid isn't the subtlest of satanic tempters. With his lisp and his clammy little leer, he looks like an old queen keen on trading an aging butt-boy (Count Dooku) for fresh meat — which leaves Anakin looking more and more like a 15-watt bulb." McDiarmid had expressed interest in reprising the role of Palpatine in the planned Star Wars: Underworld TV series, which remains un-produced, but according to Cory Barlog, would have depicted the character as "a sympathetic figure who was wronged by this fucking heartless woman. She's this hardcore gangster, and she just totally destroyed him as a person."

In the 2019 film The Rise of Skywalker, the ninth episode in the Skywalker saga, McDiarmid returned to the role of Palpatine on screen for the first time since Revenge of the Sith. McDiarmid spoke of the process behind Palpatine's first scene in the film:

McDiarmid was surprised to learn of the filmmakers' decision to bring back Palpatine, given the character died in Return of the Jedi. The film's director, J. J. Abrams, spoke of Palpatine's inclusion in the sequel trilogy: "...when you look at this as nine chapters of a story, perhaps the weirder thing would be if Palpatine didn't return. You just look at what he talks about, who he is, how important he is, what the story is — strangely, his absence entirely from the third trilogy would be conspicuous". On Palpatine's portrayal in the film, McDiarmid said, "he's fairly physically impaired, but his mind is as sharp as ever."

Make-up and costumes

Transforming McDiarmid into Emperor Palpatine in Return of the Jedi required extensive makeup. McDiarmid remarked in an interview with Star Wars Insider, "Yes—that was a four-hour job, initially, although we got it down to about two-and-a-half in the end. But this was just a little bit of latex here and there, a little bit of skin-scrunching." Film critic Roger Ebert wrote that the Emperor "looks uncannily like Death in The Seventh Seal," and film historian Robin Wood compares him to the hag from Snow White and the Seven Dwarfs (1937). McDiarmid remarked, "When my face changes in [Revenge of the Sith], my mind went back to the early silent movie of The Phantom of the Opera with Lon Chaney." Conversely, he required little makeup in The Phantom Menace and Attack of the Clones. He recalled, "I'm ... slightly aged [in AotC]. In the last film, I had a fairly standard make-up on, but now, they're starting to crinkle my face."

Palpatine's wardrobe in the prequels, tailored by costume designer Trisha Biggar, played an important part in the development of the character. In Attack of the Clones, explained McDiarmid, "The costumes ... have got much more edge to them, I think than the mere senator had in The Phantom Menace. So we see the trappings of power." On Revenge of the Sith, McDiarmid said that "To wear the costumes as the character I play is wonderfully empowering." McDiarmid's favorite costume in the film was a high-collared jacket that resembles snake or lizard skin. He stated that "it just feels reptilian, which is exactly right for [Palpatine]." According to Biggar, the character's costumes proved the most daunting challenge. She said, "His six costumes get progressively darker and more ornately decorated throughout the movie. He wears greys and browns, almost going to black, taking him toward the dark side."

In The Rise of Skywalker, Palpatine is unable to move without the aid of a large machine, to which he is attached. He is depicted as having eyes without pupils and rotting hands. Costume designer Michael Kaplan opted to dress Palpatine in a utilitarian black robe, which he wears for the majority of the film. At the end of the film, Palpatine rejuvenates himself using the Force and becomes physically mobile. He dons a new costume — a formal robe with red velvet — which Kaplan refers to as "his true Emperor's garb".

In popular culture 

With the premiere of Return of the Jedi and the prequel films and the accompanying merchandising campaign, Palpatine became an icon in American popular culture. Kenner/Hasbro produced and marketed a series of action figures of the character from 1983 to 2005. According to John Shelton Lawrence and Robert Jewett, "These action figures allow children ('4 & up') to handle the symbols of the Force."

Academics have debated the relationship of Palpatine to modern culture. Religion scholars Ross Shepard Kraemer, William Cassidy, and Susan Schwartz compare Palpatine and Star Wars heroes to the theological concept of dualism. They insist, "One can certainly picture the evil emperor in Star Wars as Satan, complete with his infernal powers, leading his faceless minions such as his red-robed Imperial Guards." Lawrence and Jewett argue that Vader killing Palpatine in Return of the Jedi represented "the permanent subduing of evil". However, according to director J. J. Abrams, Palpatine's return in The Rise of Skywalker represented the idea that evil can return as a result of complacency. He said, "I think the idea that if we are not careful, the evil — the ultimate evil — will rise again."

Since Return of the Jedi and the prequel films, Palpatine's name has been invoked as a caricature in politics. A Seattle Post-Intelligencer editorial noted that anti-pork bloggers were caricaturing West Virginia Senator Robert Byrd as "the Emperor Palpatine of pork", with Senator Ted Stevens of Alaska having "clear aspirations to be his Darth Vader." The charge followed a report that linked a secret hold on the Federal Funding Accountability and Transparency Act of 2006 to the two senators. Politicians have made comparisons as well. In 2005, Democratic Senator Frank Lautenberg of New Jersey compared Republican Majority Leader Bill Frist of Tennessee to Palpatine in a speech on the Senate floor, complete with a visual aid.

A Fox News editorial stated "no cultural icon can exist without someone trying to stuff it into a political ideology. The Star Wars saga, the greatest pop culture icon of the last three decades, is no exception... Palpatine's dissolution of the Senate in favor of imperial rule has been compared to Julius Caesar's marginalization of the Roman Senate, Hitler's power-grabs as chancellor on his way to becoming a dictator, Franklin D. Roosevelt's failed court-packing scheme and the creation of a perceived Imperial Presidency in the United States."

On the Internet
In the mid-late 2010s, the character became the subject of various internet memes, emphasizing certain lines of dialogue the character spoke in Star Wars: Episode III – Revenge of the Sith.

Relationships

Apprentices

Canon 

 Darth Maul
 Count Dooku/Darth Tyranus
 Wilhuff Tarkin (Protégé)
 Ankain Skywalker/Darth Vader
 Gallius Rax (Protégé)
 Inquisitorius (Jedi hunters)
 Snoke (puppet)
 Kylo Ren (secretly)

Legends

 Darth Maul
 A Nikto
 Vergere
 Count Dooku/Darth Tyranus
 Ankain Skywalker/Darth Vader
 Garth Ezzar
 Ferus Olin
 Mara Jade
 Cronal
 Ennix Devia (Assassin)
 Lumiya
 Luke Skywalker (briefly)
 Sedriss QL

Family tree

|-
|style="text-align: left;"|Notes:

References
FootnotesCitations

Works cited

Further reading
 Anderson, Kevin J., and Daniel Wallace. The Essential Chronology. New York: Del Rey, 2000. .
 Bortolin, Matthew. The Dharma of Star Wars. Somerville, Mass.: Wisdom Publications, 2005. .
 Feeney, Mark. Nixon at the Movies: A Book about Belief. Chicago: University of Chicago Press, 2004. .
 Hanson, Michael J., and Max S. Kay. Star Wars: The New Myth. Philadelphia: Xlibris, 2002. .
 Horne, Michael Allen. Dark Empire Sourcebook. Honesdale, Penn.: West End Games, 1993. .
 Jensen, Hans, and Richard Chasemore. Star Wars: Complete Locations. New York: DK Publishing, 2005. .
 Luceno, James. Star Wars: Episode III – Revenge of the Sith: The Visual Dictionary. New York: DK Publishing, 2005. .
 Lyden, John. "The Apocalyptic Cosmology of Star Wars." Journal of Religion and Film 4 (No. 1, April 2000): online.
 Peña, Abel G. "Evil Never Dies: The Sith Dynasties." Star Wars Insider 88 (June 2006).
 Reynolds, David West. Episode I: The Visual Dictionary New York: DK Publishing, 1999. .
 Reynolds, David West. Star Wars: Attack of the Clones: The Visual Dictionary. New York: DK Publishing, 2002. .
 Smith, Jeffrey A. "Hollywood Theology: The Commodification of Religion in Twentieth-Century Films." Religion and American Culture 11 (No. 2, Summer 2001): pp. 191–231.
 Velasco, Raymond L. A Guide to the Star Wars Universe. New York: Del Rey, 1984. .
 Wallace, Daniel. The New Essential Guide to Characters. New York: Del Rey, 2002. .
 Wallace, Daniel, and Kevin J. Anderson. The New Essential Chronology. New York: Del Rey, 2005. .

External links
 
 
 Emperor Palpatine on IMDb

Characters created by George Lucas
Extraterrestrial supervillains
Fantasy television characters
Film characters introduced in 1980
Film supervillains
Fictional chancellors
Fictional characters with disfigurements
Fictional characters with electric or magnetic abilities
Fictional characters with precognition
Fictional clones
Fictional dictators
Fictional warlords
Fictional filicides
Fictional characters who committed familicide
Fictional gentry
Fictional lords and ladies
Fictional senators
Fictional energy swordfighters
Fictional genocide perpetrators
Fictional war criminals
Fictional mass murderers
Fictional spymasters
Fictional torturers
Fictional telekinetics
Fictional wizards
Fictional monarchists
Galactic emperors
Film and television memes
Internet memes
Internet memes introduced in 2012
Male film villains
Male characters in film
Male characters in television
Male supervillains
Star Wars comics characters
Star Wars literary characters
Star Wars Skywalker Saga characters
Star Wars: The Bad Batch characters
Star Wars: The Clone Wars characters
Star Wars Rebels characters
Tales of the Jedi (TV series) characters
Star Wars video game characters
Star Wars Sith characters
Video game bosses
Fictional characters with spirit possession or body swapping abilities